The Durst Organization is one of the oldest family-run commercial and residential real estate companies in New York City. Established in 1915, the company is owned and operated by the third generation of the Durst family.  As of 2014, it owns and manages more than 8.5 million square feet of Class A office space in Midtown Manhattan and over 1 million square feet of luxury residential rentals. It is a member of the Real Estate Board of New York (REBNY). Forbes magazine estimates the Durst family fortune at $8.1 billion.

Early history
In 1902, Jewish immigrant Joseph Durst arrived in the United States from Gorlice, Galicia, Austria-Hungary with three dollars to his name. He found work as a tailor in New York City, and in 1912, he became a full partner in a dress manufacturer, Durst & Rubin.

Using the profits from his business, Durst bought his first building in 1915: The Century Building at One West 34th Street. In 1926, he acquired the original Temple Emanu-El at 5th Avenue and 43rd Street, from Benjamin Winter Sr. the largest synagogue building in the United States at the time; it was demolished in 1927 to make room for commercial development. In 1927, he formed The Durst Organization.

More purchases included:
In 1929, the first residential building, a 15-story building at Fifth Avenue and 85th Street;
In 1936, the Park Hill Theater and store in Yonkers, New York;
In 1944, 205 East 42nd Street.

Shift to development and construction
In the 1950s, The Durst Organization shifted from primarily real estate management to new construction and development. They assembled the parcels for and completed the following buildings, all of which it still owns:
In 1958, a 29-story building at 200 East 42nd Street (655 Third Avenue);
In 1961, the 24-story 733 Third Avenue;
In 1966, the 32-story, 201 East 42nd Street (675 Third Avenue).
In 1968, they purchased Henry Miller's Theatre (the theater was later demolished—although the facade was preserved—to build the Bank of America Tower) and the entire block facing Broadway between 44th and 45th Streets;
In 1969, the 40-story 825 Third Avenue;
In 1970, the 45-story 1133 Avenue of the Americas;

In 1974, Joseph Durst died and his son Seymour Durst took control of the company during the real estate crash of the 1970s.

In 1984, the 41-story 1155 Avenue of the Americas;
In 1989, the 26-story 114 West 47th Street;

In 1992, Seymour Durst retired and his son Douglas Durst took control of the company. Seymour died in 1995.

In 1999, the 48-story 4 Times Square;
In 2005, the 38-story Helena at 601 West 57th Street;
In 2007, the 57-story Epic on 125 West 31st Street;
In 2008, the 58-story Bank of America Tower at One Bryant Park;
Estimated in 2021, the 71-story building named Sven, located at Queens Plaza Park.

See also
National Debt Clock, created by Seymour Durst.
Robert Durst (1943–2022), the estranged son of Seymour and brother of current Durst Organization CEO Douglas.

References

External links

Real estate companies of the United States
1915 establishments in New York (state)
Companies based in New York City
Real estate companies established in 1915
American companies established in 1915